Helen E. Nordquist [״Nordie״] (born March 23, 1932) is a former pitcher and right fielder who played from  through  in the All-American Girls Professional Baseball League.

Helen Nordquist pitched and played at outfield in the AAGPBL during the final four years of its existence. She threw a strong fastball and a good curveball, and led all outfielders for the most assists during her rookie season.

Born in Boston, Massachusetts lived in Malden, Nordquist learned to play sandlot ball with other neighborhood kids when she was eight years old. She played organized softball at high school and joined the AAGPBL right after graduation.

Nordquist entered the league in 1951 with the Kenosha Comets, appearing in a career-high 82 games while leading the league in assists. She was traded to the Rockford Peaches the next year and switched to pitching, but had control problems and allowed more walks than strikeouts, being much more effective as a hitter than as a pitcher. After two years at Rockford she joined the South Bend Blue Sox in 1954, her last season.

After the league folded, Nordquist worked as a telephone operator and an accountant in Massachusetts and a toll collector for the state of New Hampshire, retiring in 1994. In addition, she played and coached softball for more than 30 years.

She is part of Women in Baseball, a permanent display at the Baseball Hall of Fame and Museum at Cooperstown, New York unveiled in 1988, which is dedicated to the entire All-American Girls Professional Baseball League.

Statistics
Pitching

Batting

Collective fielding

Sources

All-American Girls Professional Baseball League players
American people of Swedish descent
Baseball players from Massachusetts
Sportspeople from Malden, Massachusetts
1932 births
Living people
21st-century American women